Kaia or KAIA may refer to:

 Kaia (name), including a list of people with the name
 KaiA, a gene
 KAIA (group), a Filipino girl group
 KAIA (FM), radio station (91.5 FM) licensed to Blytheville, Arkansas, United States
 King Abdulaziz International Airport, Saudi Arabia's third largest airport
 The ICAO code for Alliance Municipal Airport in Nebraska, United States
 Kabul International Airport

See also 
 Caia (disambiguation)
 Kaja (disambiguation)
 Kaya (disambiguation)